Umberto Bazzoli (Verona, 1860 – after 1887) was an Italian painter, mainly of landscapes and portraits.

He first studied under Ercole Calvi; then traveled to study in Rome, Florence, and Milan. In the latter city, he studied at the Brera Academy  under Filippo Carcano. At the 1887 Exhibition of Venice, he displayed four lauded canvases: Mountains of Bergamo; Sotto i faggi; Portrait, and  Autumn Vespers. He also exhibited in Milan and Munich.

References

1860 births
19th-century Italian painters
Italian male painters
Painters from Verona
Year of death missing
19th-century Italian male artists